WUSA is a 1970 American drama film directed by Stuart Rosenberg, starring Paul Newman, Joanne Woodward, and Anthony Perkins, and co-starring Laurence Harvey, Cloris Leachman and Wayne Rogers. It was written by Robert Stone, based on his 1967 novel A Hall of Mirrors. The story involves a radio station in New Orleans with the eponymous call sign that is apparently involved in a right-wing conspiracy. It culminates with a riot and stampede at a patriotic pep rally when an assassin on a catwalk opens fire.

Plot
Rheinhardt, a cynical drifter, gets a job as an announcer for WUSA, a conservative talk radio station in New Orleans. He is content to parrot WUSA's reactionary editorial stance on the air, even if he does not agree with it. Rheinhardt finds his cynical detachment challenged by a woman he meets in a bar, Geraldine, and by Rainey, a neighbor and troubled idealist who becomes aware of WUSA's sinister, hidden purpose. And when events start spinning out of control, even Rheinhardt finds he must take a stand.

Bingamon, the station's owner, is sponsoring a white supremacist hate rally that draws a protest from black militants. Rainey attempts to assassinate Bingamon, but after he misses and accidentally wounds someone else, the crowd beats him to death. In the chaos, drugs end up in the possession of Geraldine, who is arrested by the police and later hangs herself in jail. Rheinhardt packs his bags and leaves town.

Cast

Paul Newman as Rheinhardt
Joanne Woodward as Geraldine
Anthony Perkins as Morgan Rainey
Laurence Harvey as Farley
Pat Hingle as Matthew Bingamon
Don Gordon as Bogdanovich
Michael Anderson, Jr. as Marvin
Leigh French as Girl
Bruce Cabot as King Wolyoe
Cloris Leachman as Philomene
Moses Gunn as Clotho
Wayne Rogers as Minter
Robert Quarry as Jack Noonan
Skip Young as Rep. Jimmy Snipe
B.J. Mason as Roosevelt Berry
Sahdji as Hollywood
Geoffrey Edwards as Irving, Disc Jockey
Hal Baylor as Shorty
Clifton James as Speed, Sailor in Bar
Tol Avery as Senator
Paul Hampton as Rusty Fargo
Jerry Catron as Sidewinder Bates
Preservation Hall Jazz Band

Reception
Anthony Perkins was nominated for best supporting actor of the year by the National Society of Film Critics.

In the 1970s Paul Newman called it "the most significant film I've ever made and the best."

Roger Greenspun, reviewing the film for The New York Times, wrote: "If it were an ordinary bad movie (and it is a very bad movie), WUSA might, in spite of the distinguished names, and less distinguished presence, of its leading actors, be dismissed with no more than a nod to the tension between Rosenberg's ponderously emphatic direction, and Robert Stone's ponderously allusive screenplay. I suspect Stone wins out, for WUSA feels more like poor theater than poor moviemaking—so, that it continually suggests a failed version of The Balcony, even though it strives to fall short of The Manchurian Candidate...Despite its obsession with collecting evidence, and its handy school of pseudo-documentary, WUSA fights unreal battles with an unseen enemy. Lacking either the grace of art or the vitality of guerrilla theater, it can offer only the coarsest nourishment—and only to the elaborately self-deceived."

See also
 List of American films of 1970

References

External links
 
 
 

1970 films
1970s political drama films
American political drama films
Films about radio people
Films based on American novels
Films directed by Stuart Rosenberg
Films produced by John Foreman (producer)
Films scored by Lalo Schifrin
Films set in New Orleans
Films shot in New Orleans
Paramount Pictures films
Works by Robert Stone (novelist)
1970 drama films
1970s English-language films
1970s American films